Ray Lynch: Best Of, Volume One is Ray Lynch's first (and only) compilation album. In addition to songs from Lynch's previous albums, the compilation also includes three new music tracks, Ralph's Rhapsody, The Music of What Happens, and a remix of Celestial Soda Pop. The album peaked at #19 on Billboard's "Top New Age Albums Chart".

Reception
Carmel Carrillo of The Baltimore Sun gave the album two stars out of five, praising Lynch's combination of "synthesized and classical styles" but criticized the three new tracks, commentating that they are "disappointing compared with his better-known works from previous releases." Carrillo especially criticized the "Celestial Soda Pop" remix for being "too techno for many New Age devotees." Meanwhile, Steve Huey of Allmusic game the album 4.5/5 stars, claiming that the album is "the perfect introduction to Lynch's brand of lush, ambient electronic music."

Track listing
Ray Lynch: Best Of, Volume One includes the following tracks.

Personnel 
All music composed, arranged, and produced by Ray Lynch except The Oh of Pleasure which is co–written with Tom Canning.

 Ray Lynch – keyboards
 Mel McMurrin – sampled voices
 John Gregory – violin improvisations
 Tom Canning – Prophet 5 keyboards
 Geraldine Walther – viola
 David Kadarauch – cello
 Julie Ann Giacobassi – oboe and English horn
 Glen Fishthal – trumpet, flugelhorn and piccolo trumpet
 Timothy Day – flute
 David Krehbiel – French horn
 Daniel Kobialka – violin
 Nancy Severance – viola

Charts

References

1998 greatest hits albums
Ray Lynch albums
Windham Hill Records compilation albums